Koupelo  is a village in the Oury Department of Balé Province in southern Burkina Faso. As of 2005 the village had a total population of 653.

References

Populated places in the Boucle du Mouhoun Region